Ahmed Hebh is a Saudi football player who currently plays as a midfielder.

External links
Eurosport.fr Profile 
Goalaz.com 

slstat.com Profile

1985 births
Living people
Saudi Arabian footballers
Al-Shoulla FC players
Al-Mujazzal Club players
Sdoos Club players
Al-Diriyah Club players
Saudi First Division League players
Saudi Professional League players
Saudi Second Division players
Association football midfielders